De La Salle College, Cronulla is an independent Roman Catholic comprehensive co-educational secondary day school, located in Cronulla a southern suburb of Sydney, New South Wales, Australia.

Established in 1936 by the De La Salle Brothers, the college currently caters for approximately 470 students in Year 11 and Year 12 from the Sutherland Shire parishes of the Archdiocese of Sydney. The college is under the patronage of the Archbishop of Sydney, Anthony Fisher. De La Salle College is one of 18 Lasallian Schools in Australia, and in 1994 appointed its first lay headmaster. The school is also affiliated with the Catholic Secondary Schools Association NSW/ACT.

History
The De La Salle Brothers purchased a bushland property, 'Kilkivan Grange,' in 1936 for the purpose of a College for Catholic boys and used an existing house on the property for boarding students.

Brother Donatus Slattery was appointed the inaugural Principal of De La Salle College
Cronulla in 1936 and was a much-loved gentle man who died in Sydney in 1962.

From 1936 to 1967, students from Primary classes to Leaving Certificate level attended the college, but in 1967, in co-operation with the nearby De La Salle College in Caringbah, the present structure of a Senior College for Years 11 and 12 only was established.

In 1975, the College admitted girls for the first time, accepting school certificate graduates from Our Lady of Mercy College, Burraneer. In 1990 the Catholic Education Office, Archdiocese of Sydney took over administrative responsibility for the college.

Former Principal Brother Stan Carmody (died 5 February 2011, aged 92) encouraged the development of the senior rugby league team which produced several outstanding National Rugby League players.

In 1994 the first lay principal was appointed.

College Principals
 Brother Donatus Slattery (1936)
 Brother Vincent Latham (1937)
 Brother George Lyons (1938-1939)
 Brother Eugene Donegan (1940-1945)
 Brother Dositheus O’Dea (1946-1949)
 Brother Leo Caldwell (1950-1954)
 Brother Leopold Deignan (1955-1960)
 Brother John Neil (1961-1966)
 Brother Celestine Gavin (1967-1973)
 Brother Walter Farrell (1974)
 Brother Edward Gehrig (1975-1976)
 Brother Stanislaus Carmody (1977-1986)
 Brother Kenneth Ormerod (1987-1989)
 Brother Malachy Yates (1990-1993)
 Mrs Julia O’Connor (1994-1995)
 Mr John Maguire (1996-2004)
 Mr John Riordan (2005-2008)
 Mr Phil Gane (2009-2015)
 Mr Craig Mooney (2016-2019)
 Mr Stephen Mahoney (2020-present)

Notable alumni

John Della Bosca – politician
Jonathan Docking – rugby league football player
Andrew Ettinghausen – athlete
Michael Forshaw – Senator
Steve Hutchins- Senator and ALP president
 John Kane and Genni Kane – musicians in the band Flying Emus
James Hughes - Radio Presenter
 John Lee – former Director General of the NSW Department of Premier & Cabinet and now CEO of the Tourism and Transport Forum of Australia
Michael Lee – former Federal Minister
Fran Molloy – journalist  
Peter Morrissey – fashion designer
Tony Sheldon – trade union official
Carmel Tebbutt – former Deputy Premier of NSW
Mark Vincent – opera singer, weightloss expert
Vanessa Ware – netball player
Glenn Wheeler – TV/radio personality
Brendan Cowell – TV/radio personality

See also 

 List of Catholic schools in New South Wales
 Lasallian educational institutions
 Catholic education in Australia

References

External links 
De La Salle College Cronulla website
Lasallian Schools

Educational institutions established in 1936
Catholic secondary schools in Sydney
1936 establishments in Australia
Cronulla, New South Wales
Cronulla